La Luz Pottery Factory is a former factory in La Luz, New Mexico. The buildings, including three houses, an adobe warehouse and kiln, a clay processing plant, and storerooms, were built circa 1929. The factory, founded by Rowland Hazard, made roof and floor tiles as well as pots until it closed down in 1942. The tiles were used in buildings like the Albuquerque Little Theatre. The complex has been listed on the National Register of Historic Places since May 29, 1979.

References

Adobe buildings and structures in New Mexico
Commercial buildings on the National Register of Historic Places in New Mexico	
National Register of Historic Places in Otero County, New Mexico
Buildings and structures completed in 1929